Paul William Whear (November 13, 1925 – March 25, 2021) was an American composer, conductor, music educator, and double-bassist.

Life and career 

Whear (full name Paul William Whear) was born in Auburn, Indiana, and studied at Marquette University, the Catholic Jesuit University in Milwaukee where he received the B.N.S. After service as an officer in the U.S Navy, he attended DePauw University School of Music in Greencastle, Indiana, where he received the Bachelor of Music and Master of Music, and  Western Reserve University in Cleveland, Ohio, where he received the Ph.D. He received the Honorary Doctor of Fine Arts from Marquette University in 2002.

He taught theory and composition at Mount Union College in Alliance, Ohio, (1952–1960) as well as at Doane College in Crete, Nebraska, where he was chairman of the music department (1960–1969). He and his wife, violinist Nancy Robinson Voiers, played in the Lincoln Symphony during this time. Later he became a professor at Marshall University in Huntington, West Virginia, where he also was composer in residence and conductor of the Huntington Symphony Orchestra and the Huntington Chamber Orchestra. He retired as emeritus composer and conductor and received an honorary doctorate at Marquette University. He also taught theory, composition, and orchestration courses at the National Music Camp (now Interlochen Center for the Arts) in Interlochen, Michigan (1969–1988).

He appeared as a guest conductor in the United States, Canada, Japan, the Netherlands and the United Kingdom. As a composer he won many prizes and distinctions, including a grant from the National Endowment for the Arts,  a Huntington Hartford Fellow residence, numerous ASCAP Awards, and numerous McDowell Artist Colony Fellowships. He is listed in Baker's Biographical Dictionary of Musicians, and was named "one of America's Top Ten Composers for Band In Fanfare Magazine (1963). For 60 years he conducted numerous band and orchestra clinics at the annual Midwest Musician Educators' Conference in Chicago. His works have been performed by leading orchestras, such as the London Symphony Orchestra, Philadelphia Orchestra, Cleveland Philharmonic, Cleveland Orchestra, Indianapolis Symphony, Rochester Civic Orchestra, Omaha Symphony, Lincoln Symphony, Charleston Symphony, the U.S. Navy Band, the U.S. Naval Academy Band, the U.S. Military Academy Band (West Point), and the Band of the Coldstream Guards, London.

Whear died on March 25, 2021, at the age of 95.

Writings 
 1960. "Problems of the Small College Band". Music Educators Journal 46, no. 4 (Feb.–Mar.): 76–78.

Compositions

Orchestra 
 A Celtic Set, for string orchestra
 A Shakespeare Prelude, for orchestra
 An Appalachian Folk Tale, for speaker and orchestra 1980
Catskill Legend 1963
 Catharsis Suite, for orchestra 1967
 Concertino, for string orchestra 
 Overture
 Dirge
 Toccata
 Lancaster Overture 1963
Decade Overture
It's The Pizz
 Mallard Cove—Prelude and Rondo, for string orchestra
 Olympiad, for string orchestra
 Overture for strings, for string orchestra
 Pastorale Lament, for horn and string orchestra
 Prelude to the Ten Commandments, for orchestra
 Preludio, for string orchestra 1966- for the Vivaldi Orchestra of Manachester, U.K.
 Psalms of Celebration - Part I, for mixed choir, orchestra and brass 
 Psalms of Celebration - Part II, for mixed choir, orchestra and brass
 Psalms of Celebration - Part III, for mixed choir, orchestra and brass
 Reflections, Scherzo for Strings, for string orchestra
Seven
Stars in a Field of Blue
 Symphony No. 2, "The Bridge" : In Memoriam RVW (2nd Movement)   
 Symphony No. 3, " The Galleries", commissioned by the Huntington Art Museum
 The Chief Justice John Marshall, A Musical Epic for speaker, choir, and orchestra: commissioned by Marshall University
 Waltz, for strings
 White River Legend (Overture), commissioned by The Blue Lake Fine Arts Camp

Band 
 1958 Hartshorn, overture - Whear's first published work
 1962 Jedermann, overture
 1964 Contrapunctus
 1964 Czech Suite
 Romantic Song
 Rippling Waters
 Festival Dance
 1964 Kensington Overture
 1966 Antietam
 1968 Bellerophon, overture
 1968 Land of Lincoln, concert march
 1968 Decade Overture
 1969 Wycliffe Variations
 1970 Elsinore Overture
 1971 Stonehenge Symphony - Symphony no. 1 for Purdue University Centennial
 Solstice
 Evocations
 Sacrifice
 1972 Of This Time
 1973 Lexington Overture
 1979 Celebration XXV
 1981 The Enterprise Overture
 1982 Symphony No. 4: Commissioned by Harry Pfingsten, Avon Lake High School Band
 Overture
 Melodrama
 Finale
 A Lyric Suite
 Prelude
 Clog Dance
 Pastorale
 Procession
 An Appalachian set
 Canada—A Folksong Set for Band
 Catskill Legend
The Chief Justice
 Defenders of the Blue:  Parade March for the Strategic Air Command
 Down to the Sea in Ships - US Navy Band Commission
 Eternal Father
 Introduction and Invention
Lincoln: 5th Symphony commissioned by the Library of Congress honoring Abraham Lincoln's 200th birthday
 Modal Miniatures -
 Proscenium Overture
 Quiet Music, based on Hans Leo Hassler’s Passion Chorale
 Sonata for Band
Stars in a Field of Blue
 Yorktown, 1781
Symphony  5: Lincoln   commission by the Library of Congress in honor of Lincoln's 200th birthday

Ballet

 High Flight - based on John Gillespie Magee 's poem

Stage Work

 The Door, opera
The Devil's Disciple - unfinished opera

Choir 
 Old Gold—a Celebration, for mixed choir
 Crystals, for three-part women’s choir, three flutes, harp and percussion
Mass for Today

Vocal music 
 Sounds of Celebration, for baritone solo, mixed choir and band
 The Seasons, for baritone solo, mixed choir and orchestra
 Sonnets from Shakespeare, for baritone solo and chamber orchestra
Gods Grandeur 1974 Commissioned by Jane Hobson for the Dedication of Pearl Buck's Birthplace

Chamber music 
 1975 Trio Variations, for cello, clarinet and piano
 A Separate Piece, for bassoon solo
 Five Haiku, for flute (or piccolo)
 March of the Viols, for contrabass and piano
 Prelude and Toccata, for trombone quartet
 Sonata "The Briefcase", for viola and piano
 Sonata, for cello solo (1979)
 Sonata, for trombone (or baritone) and piano (©1963)
 String Quartet No. 3 "The Phoenix"
String Quartet: Four for Four
 Suite, for violin and cello (1984)
 Canon
 March
 Ostinato Aria
 Toccata
 The Viol Habit, for contrabass and piano
 Three Chorales, for brass quartet or brass ensemble
 Lass't uns erfreuen by Johann Christian Bach
 Chorale for Brasses by Carl Ludwig
 Freuet Euch Ihr Christen by Johann Sebastian Bach

Organ 
 Music For Service With "Truro" (together with David Craighead)

This article translated from the Dutch Wikipedia

References 
 Anderson, E. Ruth. Contemporary American Composers: A Biographical Dictionary, second edition. Boston: G. K. Hall, 1982. . (First edition, Boston: G. K. Hall, 1976. )
 Berger, Kenneth Walter. Band Encyclopedia. Kent, Ohio: Band Associates, 1960.
 Bierley, Paul E., and William H. Rehrig. The Heritage Encyclopedia of Band Music: Composers and Their Music. Westerville, Ohio: Integrity Press, 1991. .
 Bly, Leon Joseph. 1978. "The March in American Society". PhD diss. Coral Gables: University of Miami.
 Bull, Storm. Index to Biographies of Contemporary Composers, vol. 2. Metuchen, N.J.: Scarecrow Press, 1974. .
 
 Frank, Paul, Burchard Bulling, Florian Noetzel, and Helmut Rosner. Kurzgefasstes Tonkünstler Lexikon - Zweiter Teil: Ergänzungen und Erweiterungen seit 1937, fifteenth edition, vol 1: A-K. Wilhelmshaven: Heinrichshofen, 1974. ; Band 2: L-Z. 1976. .
 Hedges, Bonnie Lois, and Bonlyn Hall. "Twentieth-Century Composers in the Chesapeake Region". In Twentieth-Century Composers in the Chesapeake Region: A Bio-bibliography and Guide to Library Holdings. Richmond, Virginia: Chesapeake Chapter Music Library Association, 1994.
 Press, Jaques Cattell. Who's Who in American Music: Classical, first edition, New York: R. R. Bowker, 1983. .
 Press, Jaques Cattell. ASCAP Biographical Dictionary of Composers, Authors and Publishers, fourth edition. New York: R. R. Bowker, 1980. .
 
 Suppan, Wolfgang, and Armin Suppan. Das Neue Lexikon des Blasmusikwesens, fourth edition. Freiburg-Tiengen: Blasmusikverlag Schulz GmbH, 1994. .

External links 
 Paul Whear Music Scores at the Library of Congress

1925 births
2021 deaths
American male classical composers
American classical composers
20th-century classical composers
21st-century classical composers
American music educators
American male conductors (music)
American classical double-bassists
Marquette University alumni
DePauw University alumni
Case Western Reserve University alumni
University of Mount Union faculty
Marshall University faculty
People from Auburn, Indiana
21st-century American composers
20th-century American composers
20th-century American conductors (music)
21st-century American conductors (music)
21st-century double-bassists
20th-century American male musicians
21st-century American male musicians
Male double-bassists
United States Navy personnel of World War II
United States Navy officers